The Autocar Sales and Service Building, at 2745 Locust in St. Louis, Missouri, was built in 1917.  It was listed on the National Register of Historic Places in 2006.

It was designed by St. Louis architect Preston J. Bradshaw.  It is a two-story brown brick concrete-framed curtain wall building.  It includes Classical Revival details.

References

National Register of Historic Places in St. Louis
Buildings and structures completed in 1917